The 1948–49 Oberliga  was the fourth season of the Oberliga, the first tier of the football league system in the three western zones of Allied-occupied Germany. The league operated in six regional divisions, Berlin, North, South, Southwest (north and south) and West. The five league champions, the runners-up from the North, South, Southwest and West and the third-placed team from the South entered the 1949 German football championship which was won by VfR Mannheim. It was VfR Mannheim's only national championship.

The Oberliga Südwest, covering the French occupation zone in Germany, operated in two regional divisions, north and south, with a championship final at the end of season.

In East Germany the DDR-Oberliga was established after the 1948–49 season in the Soviet occupation zone, set at the first tier of the league system. In 1949 an Eastern zone championship, the 1949 Ostzonenmeisterschaft, was held and won by ZSG Union Halle, but its winner did not advance to the German championship.

In post-Second World War Germany many clubs were forced to change their names or merge. This policy was particularly strongly enforced in the Soviet and French occupation zones but much more relaxed in the British and US one. In most cases clubs eventually reverted to their original names, especially after the formation of the Federal Republic of Germany in 1949.

During the course of the 1948–49 league season the political landscape in Germany changed with the Federal Republic of Germany, commonly referred to as West Germany, established on 23 May 1949, followed by the German Democratic Republic, commonly referred to as East Germany, on 7 October 1949. I t was the first tier of the football league system in the three western zones of Allied-occupied Germany.

Oberliga Nord
The 1948–49 season saw three new clubs promoted to the league, TuS Bremerhaven 93, Eimsbütteler TV and SC Göttingen 05. No team was relegated from the league at the end of season as the league was expanded to 16 teams in 1949–50.

Oberliga Berlin
The 1948–49 season saw three new clubs promoted to the league, Viktoria 89 Berlin, SV Lichtenberg 47 and Minerva 93 Berlin.

Oberliga West
The 1948–49 season saw three new clubs promoted to the league, Rot-Weiß Essen, Rhenania Würselen and Preußen Münster.

Relegation play-offs
Group A

Group B

Group C

Oberliga Südwest

Northern group
The 1948–49 season saw three new clubs promoted to the league, Eintracht Trier, SpVgg Weisenau and BSC Oppau.

Southern group
The 1948–49 season saw two new clubs promoted to the league, SV Tübingen and FC 08 Villingen.

Finals
The winners of the two regional divisions of the Oberliga Südwest played a final to determine the league champion who was also directly qualified for the German championship:

|}

The runners-up of the two divisions determined the club who would face the loser of the championship final for the second place in the German championship:

|}

|}

Oberliga Süd
The 1948–49 season saw two new clubs promoted to the league, BC Augsburg and 1. Rödelheimer FC 02.

German championship

The 1949 German football championship was contested by the eight qualified Oberliga teams and won by VfR Mannheim, defeating Borussia Dortmund in the final. It was played in a knock-out format and consisted of ten clubs.

References

Sources
 30 Jahre Bundesliga  30th anniversary special, publisher: kicker Sportmagazin, published: 1993
 kicker-Almanach 1990  Yearbook of German football, publisher: kicker Sportmagazin, published: 1989, 
 DSFS Liga-Chronik seit 1945  publisher: DSFS, published: 2005
 100 Jahre Süddeutscher Fußball-Verband  100 Years of the Southern German Football Federation, publisher: SFV, published: 1997

External links
 The Oberligas on Fussballdaten.de 

1948-49
1
Ger